Claudette Nevins (née Weintraub; April 10, 1937 – February 20, 2020) was an American stage, film and television actress.

Biography 
Claudette Nevins was born in Wilkes-Barre, Pennsylvania, and grew up in Brooklyn, New York. She was a daughter of merchant Joseph Weintraub and garment worker Anna Lander, both of whom emigrated from small towns in Austria to America. Nevins was a graduate of the Fiorello H. LaGuardia School of Performing Arts and a 1957 Phi Beta Kappa graduate of New York University, with a degree in English.

Nevins debuted on Broadway in The Wall (1960) with other Broadway appearances including Plaza Suite (1968) and Danton's Death (1965). She also appeared in In White America (off-Broadway) with Gloria Foster and Moses Gunn.

The National Company of The Great White Hope, in which she starred with Brock Peters, took her to Los Angeles, after which she began working in television. For two and a half years she was seen in the long-running daytime soap opera Love of Life playing Laurie Krakauer. She appeared as a series regular in Headmaster (opposite Andy Griffith), Husbands, Wives, and Lovers, and Married: the First Year (a David Jacobs project). Her guest star appearances include Beverly Hills 90210, Barnaby Jones, Melrose Place, JAG, Three's Company, Lou Grant, Without a Trace, M*A*S*H, Hart to Hart, and many others.

Her first film was the 1961 3D feature The Mask, which later became a cult classic. Other feature film appearances include Sleeping With the Enemy (with Julia Roberts), All the Marbles (with Peter Falk), and Tuff Turf (with James Spader).

Her work in regional theaters included the following: Arena Stage; Major Barbara, The Iceman Cometh, Ring Round the Moon, The Cherry Orchard with the Atlanta Repertory; King Arther, The Hostage, The Little Foxes, Major Barbara, The Homecoming, You Can't Take It With You, Twelfth Night, and with LA Shakespeare; Comedy of Errors; La Mirada: Blithe Spirit.

Nevins was a member of the Matrix Theatre Company, where she appeared in Alan Bennett's Habeas Corpus, J. B. Priestley's Dangerous Corner, Caryl Churchill's Mad Forest, and The Water Children. Other stage appearances in Los Angeles include Passion Play (Taper), Isn't it Romantic? (Pasadena), P.S. Your Cat is Dead (Westwood) and Philadelphia Story (Court).

She was a member of the Antaeus Company and with them has done staged readings of Noël Coward's Hay Fever, O'Neill's Long Day's Journey into Night, and Shakespeare's Richard III and King John.

In addition, she had extensive on-camera and voice-over commercial credits.

Personal life

Formerly married to Elliot Nevins, she married, secondly, to real estate investor Benjamin L. Pick, with whom she had two daughters, Jessica and Sabrina. Nevins died February 20, 2020, in hospice care at her home in Los Angeles.

Selected filmography

Film 
1961: The Mask .... Pam Albright
1981: All the Marbles .... Solly
1982: The American Adventure .... Mother (voice)
1983: Over Here, Mr. President .... Maggie Bohanon
1985: Tuff Turf .... Page Hiller
1987: Jake's M.O. .... Sigournet Tompkins
1991: Sleeping with the Enemy .... Dr. Rissner
1996: Final Vendetta .... Dr. Lisa Farrow
1997: The Doyles
1998: Star Trek: Insurrection .... Son'a Officer #2 
2000: Aladdin and the Adventure of All Time .... (voice)
2004: Eulogy .... Barbara Collins

Television series

1964: The Nurses .... Grace Kearney
1965: The Defenders .... Ruth Parker
1970: Headmaster .... Margaret Thompson
1972: The F.B.I.
1973: The Bob Newhart Show
1973–1974: Police Story .... Ellen Calabrese
1974: Mrs. Sundance (TV Movie) .... Mary Lant
1974: The Magician .... Suzanne
1974–1980: Barnaby Jones .... Anita Parks / Pat Runkle / Claudia Elwood / Francis Yeager / Lisa Howard
1975: Harry O .... Jessica Shannon / Margin Wayne
1975: Guilty or Innocent: The Sam Sheppard Murder Case (TV Movie) .... Marilyn Sheppard
1975: Return to the Planet of the Apes .... Nova / Judy Franklin
1976: The Dark Side of Innocence (TV movie) .... Maggie Hancock
1976: Rich Man, Poor Man Book II .... Mrs. Martindale
1976: Electra Woman and Dyna Girl .... Empress of Evil
1976–1978: Switch .... Alice / Genevieve
1977: The Possessed (TV Movie) .... Ellen Summer
1977: The Rockford Files .... Ann Louise Clement
1977: Lou Grant .... Irene Mott
1978: Barnaby Jones .... Pat Reed
1978: Husbands, Wives & Lovers .... Courtney Fielding
1979: The Lazarus Syndrome
1979: Three's Company .... Barbara
1979: Married: The First Year .... Barbara Huffman
1979: Mrs. Columbo .... Sybil
1979: M*A*S*H .... Donna Marie Parker
1980: Knots Landing .... Susan Philby
1980: Family .... Claire Hopkins
1981: Behind the Screen .... Angela Aries
1981: Hart to Hart .... Señora Piranda
1981: Jacqueline Bouvier Kennedy (TV Movie) .... Janet Bouvier Auchincloss
1981: CHiPs .... Hannah Chadway
1982: Police Squad! .... Veronica
1982: Magnum, P.I. .... Phyllis Reardon  
1984: Steambath .... Dr. Blossom Jennings
1982–1983: One Day at a Time .... Marge
1986: Hardcastle and McCormick .... Judge Sheila Mooney  
1987: The Tortellis .... The Arbiter
1987: Hotel .... Myrna Dawson  
1988: Head of the Class .... Mrs. Samuels
1988: L.A. Law .... Sarah Schindler
1989: Free Spirit .... Mildred Crater
1990: Dallas .... Lizzie Burns
1991: Designing Women .... Roseland Price
1991: Child of Darkness, Child of Light (TV Movie) .... Lenore Beavier
1991: Dead Silence (TV Movie) .... Mrs. Stillman
1992–1998: Melrose Place .... Constance Fielding
1993: Picket Fences .... Claudia Graham
1993: Beverly Hills, 90210 .... Vivian Carson
1994: Lois & Clark: The New Adventures of Superman .... Barbara Trevino
1994: Thunder Alley .... Ellen
1995: Coach .... Mrs. DiMateo  
1996: ER .... Judge
1997: 7th Heaven .... Mrs. Rainy
1997–2004: JAG .... Porter Webb
1998: Ally McBeal .... Mrs. Hollings
2000: Judging Amy .... Karen Cassidy
2000: The District .... Judge Arlene Sidwell
2001–2002: Providence .... Joyce Sidwell
2001–2002: The Agency .... Audrey Simmons
2004: Without a Trace .... Cathy Payton
2005: Strong Medicine'' .... Ava Rey (final appearance)

References

External links 
 Claudette Nevins Official Website
 
  
 

American film actresses
American television actresses
American stage actresses
Actresses from Pennsylvania
1937 births
Actors from Wilkes-Barre, Pennsylvania
New York University alumni
2020 deaths
American people of Austrian descent
21st-century American women